47th Brigade (United Kingdom)
 47th Assault Brigade (Ukraine), also known as Magura.